The canton of Arles is an administrative division of the Bouches-du-Rhône department, in southeastern France. It was created at the French canton reorganisation which came into effect in March 2015. Its seat is in Arles.

Composition

It consists of the following communes: 
Arles
Port-Saint-Louis-du-Rhône
Saintes-Maries-de-la-Mer

Councillors

Pictures of the canton

See also
 Canton of Saintes-Maries-de-la-Mer

References

Cantons of Bouches-du-Rhône